Innu Muthal (English:From today onwards) is a 2021 Malayalam fantasy movie directed Rejish Medhilia which stars Siju Wilson in the lead role. The film directly released on Zee Keralam channel on 28 March 2021. It is also streaming on ZEE5 OTT platform

Plot
Abhinandan,a driver and an ardent devotee of Lord Krishna, works hard to get out of his debt for his family but to no avail. He 
had borrowed so much money from many people and he says lies to escape from the people whom he borrowed money. However, his life changes for the good when a stranger pays him a visit.

Cast
Siju Wilson as Abhinandhan / Abhinandhan 
 Suraj Pops as Lord Krishna
 Smrithi Sugathan as Ala
 Gokulan as Eldhoppi
 Uday Chandra as Gulam Rana Muhammed 
 Kottayam Ramesh as Davis
 Indrans as Maniyappan
 Navas Vallikunnu as Chrekkalam Swami

References

2020s Malayalam-language films
2021 films
Indian fantasy films